Iryna Leonidivna Taranenko-Terelya (born March 31, 1966) is a former Ukrainian cross-country skier who competed from 1992 to 2004. She won a bronze medal in the 5 km + 10 km combined pursuit at the 1999 FIS Nordic World Ski Championships in Ramsau. She was the first woman to represent Ukraine at the Olympics.

Taranenko's best individual finish at the Winter Olympics was 4th twice at Nagano in 1998 (5 km + 10 km combined pursuit, 15 km). She also earned seven individual career victories from 1996 to 2000.

References

External links

Iryna Taranenko-Terelia at Sports-reference.com

1966 births
Living people
People from Derhachi
Ukrainian female cross-country skiers
Cross-country skiers at the 1998 Winter Olympics
Olympic cross-country skiers of Ukraine
FIS Nordic World Ski Championships medalists in cross-country skiing
Cross-country skiers at the 1994 Winter Olympics
Cross-country skiers at the 2002 Winter Olympics
Sportspeople from Kharkiv Oblast